Lake Eugenia is an artificial lake in Grey County, Ontario, Canada.

History and Geography
The lake was man-made in the early 1900s as a reservoir for a hydro-electric dam on the Beaver River built in 1912. In 1913, the Hydro Electric Power Commission of Ontario bought  of land from farmers. This land was then cleared and flooded. After being flooded, the edge of the water was full of twists and turns with bay and inlets. Beginning in the 1950s, the lake became very popular amongst locals as a get-away.

Fishing
Eugenia Lake attracts recreational fishers both local to the region and those visiting due to the range of fish in the lake. The main species of fish that can be caught in the lake include Rock, Smallmouth and Largemouth Bass, Perch, Sunfish, and Bullhead catfish.

See also
 Eugenia, Ontario

References

Euginia